Benjamin Zand (born ) is a British documentary-maker, journalist and director. He was previously a documentary executive at BBC Studios and a former head of the BBC documentary team, BBC Pop Up. He now runs his own production company, ZANDLAND Films.

Early life
Zand was born on 2 February 1991 in Liverpool, England, to an Iranian family; his father is from Tehran. He attended Bowring Comprehensive School in Huyton, Merseyside.

Career
Zand studied journalism in university. During his time there, he started a travel website and began video production. His first documentary was called Tehrangeles, featuring Iranians living in Los Angeles. After finishing his studies, he worked with production companies and eventually became a producer at the BBC World Service working on numerous radio programmes, including BBC World Have Your Say. After about a year, he moved on to BBC World News, as a producer and social media manager of BBC Facebook pages.

Zand then became a video journalist and reporter for BBC News, also becoming part of the BBC's video innovation lab. During this time, he covered stories from far-right ultranationalism to Native Americans in South Dakota. He also launched BBC Trending and BBC Newsbeats video offering, and worked for the BBC's The Travel Show. Towards the end of 2014, he started the BBC's "mobile bureau" called BBC Pop Up with a BBC colleague. Here, he travelled across the U.S. crowdsourcing story ideas and making documentaries for BBC World News and BBC News.

Benjamin then went on to become Editor of BBC Pop Up. Managing a team that flew around the world and made digital-first documentaries for an international audience. The documentaries now have millions of views online.  

After working for different departments across the BBC making documentaries, including BBC Two, BBC Three and Panorama, Ben then signed an exclusive contract to make his documentaries through the BBC Studios Documentary Unit. He became a Senior Development Executive on his own films as well as the director and author. 

In 2017, Ben set up his own production company, ZANDLAND Films. ZANDLAND Films now makes documentaries with media organisations around the world.

Ben also makes podcasts, including The Next Episode which is a youth-orientated podcast on BBC Sounds.

Additionally while working as a journalist for BBC, Zand met VICE News journalist Isobel Yeung. The two announced their dating relationship via their Instagram accounts in 2018.

Documentaries
A list featuring some of Benjamin Zand's documentaries.

The Cult of Conspiracy: QAnon 
Director Ben Zand sets out on an examination of the wildest conspiracy of our times. From the biggest names in QAnon to the front-line digital soldiers, what leads people down such a different path?

The Mysterious Murder of Nipsey Hussle 
Director Ben Zand sets out to unravel the mystery of Nipsey Hussle's murder. Who wanted him dead? Was it the police? The government? Or an old gang dispute?

Extinction Rebellion: Last Chance to Save the World  
A huge new global protest movement is changing public attitudes to climate change. Ben Zand gains access to the most high-profile activist group, Extinction Rebellion.

Confessions of a Serial Killer 
The documentary by filmmaker Ben Zand, created by ZANDLAND Films, travelled from California to Mississippi in order to investigate the story of Samuel Little. Serial killer Samuel Little claims to have murdered more than 90 women across the United States over a four-decade period, and, although the number of victims rose and rose during his rampage, the crimes were seemingly ignored. The documentary aired on Channel 4 in the UK in May 2019. The Times gave it a 4 star rating, stating: "Zand has a fresh, informal presenting style, which allows him to ask hard questions in a low-key way that gets answers."

Is This Sexual Harassment? 
Social experiment by journalist and presenter Ben Zand in which a group of people come together to try to understand what constitutes sexual harassment.

World's Most Dangerous Cities with Ben Zand
Zand visited "the most dangerous cities on earth, coming face to face with killers and terror". In this series he visited Caracas in Venezuela, Kabul in Afghanistan and Port Moresby in Papua New Guinea.

R Kelly: Sex, Girls & Videotapes
Zand explored allegations surrounding the sex life of R&B legend R Kelly, including accusations of holding women against their will in his home in Atlanta and running a degrading sex cult — allegations he denies.

R Kelly: The Sex Scandal Continues
In this follow-up film, Zand "gets to the heart of the latest allegations". Ben followed the story of the Savage family, and their daughter's involvement with R Kelly.

Trump: A Very British Welcome?
As controversial US President Donald Trump visited the UK, Zand followed both sides of the Trump protests.

Ben Zand: Cults, Gangs and God
On 18 January 2018, a three-part miniseries was released, in which he visited Guatemala, El Salvador and Costa Rica.

Ben Zand in Dictatorland
In this series Zand travelled to three countries, Kazakhstan, Tajikistan and Belarus, to see what life is like living under a dictator. He met dissidents being tracked by the state, and those close to the rulers themselves. It was broadcast on BBC Three and BBC iPlayer.

Africa's Million Pound Migrant Trail
This documentary broadcast on BBC One's Panorama programme looked at life along the migrant trail that runs through sub-Saharan Africa via Libya to Europe. Zand visited Nigeria, Niger and Libya, to take a look at what the European Union was doing to address the European migrant crisis, and to see how much money is being made.

Lebanon Stories
As part of BBC Pop Up, Zand travelled to Lebanon for a month to make four documentaries, ranging from drug lords, refugees, Islamic extremism and LGBT rights.

The Man Who Squeezes Muscles: Searching for Purple Aki
In this documentary. Zand goes in search of Akinwale Arobieke for BBC Three, and tries to understand a story that has been gripping Merseyside for decades.

The Fish Bombers
For Channel 4's Unreported World, Zand visited Malaysian Borneo, where coral reefs face environmental disaster as local fishermen resort to drastic, destructive fishing methods to survive, including using explosives and sodium cyanide.

Our World, Afrikaners on the Edge
After campus protests, some of South Africa's most prestigious universities agreed to stop teaching in Afrikaans; Zand travelled to South Africa to meet Afrikaners who fear for their future in the 'Rainbow Nation'.

The Other Side of...
Zand travelled to Pakistan and Sudan to take a look at the countries away from the news headlines.

The Secret World of Incels: UNTOLD
Zand spent a year documenting the lives of Incels living in the UK and western Europe. The programme first aired on the 7th November 2022 as part of Channel 4's UNTOLD documentary series.

Awards
Zand was named Young Talent of the Year at the 2016 Royal Television Society Journalism Awards. "The judges liked everything about Benjamin, the stories he'd found, the way he filmed them – normally on his own – and the way he told them. They found him original, fresh, provocative, versatile, and, of course, creative."

References

External links
 
 

1991 births
Living people
BBC newsreaders and journalists
Television presenters from Liverpool
English people of Iranian descent